The 2004 Cheltenham Council election took place on 10 June 2004 to elect members of Cheltenham Borough Council in Gloucestershire, England. Half of the council was up for election and the Liberal Democrats lost overall control of the council to no overall control.

After the election, the composition of the council was
Liberal Democrat: 18
Conservative: 15
People Against Bureaucracy: 5
Labour: 2

Election result
Overall turnout in the election was 39.44%.

Ward results

References

2004 English local elections
2004
2000s in Gloucestershire